Tamworth, an electoral district of the Legislative Assembly in the Australian state of New South Wales, has  had two incarnations from 1890 until 1920 and from 1927 until the present. It initially returned two members until 1894 and has since returned a single member for all subsequent elections.


Members

Election results

Elections in the 2010s

2019

2015

2011

Elections in the 2000s

2007

2003

2001 by-election

Elections in the 1990s

1999

1995

1991

Elections in the 1980s

1988

1984

1981

Elections in the 1970s

1978

1976

1973

1971

Elections in the 1960s

1968

1965

1962

Elections in the 1950s

1959

1956

1953

1950

Elections in the 1940s

1947

1944

1941

1940 by-election

Elections in the 1930s

1938

1935

1932

1930

Elections in the 1920s

1927
This section is an excerpt from 1927 New South Wales state election § Tamworth

1920 - 1927

Elections in the 1910s

1917
This section is an excerpt from 1917 New South Wales state election § Tamworth

1913

1910
This section is an excerpt from 1910 New South Wales state election § Tamworth

Elections in the 1900s

1907
This section is an excerpt from 1907 New South Wales state election § Tamworth

1904
This section is an excerpt from 1904 New South Wales state election § Tamworth

1903 by-election

1901
This section is an excerpt from 1901 New South Wales state election § Tamworth

Elections in the 1890s

1898
This section is an excerpt from 1898 New South Wales colonial election § Tamworth

1895
This section is an excerpt from 1895 New South Wales colonial election § Tamworth

1894
This section is an excerpt from 1894 New South Wales colonial election § Tamworth

1891
This section is an excerpt from 1891 New South Wales colonial election § Tamworth

Elections in the 1880s

1889 by-election

1889
This section is an excerpt from 1889 New South Wales colonial election § Tamworth

1887
This section is an excerpt from 1887 New South Wales colonial election § Tamworth

1885
This section is an excerpt from 1885 New South Wales colonial election § Tamworth

1882
This section is an excerpt from 1882 New South Wales colonial election § Tamworth

1880
This section is an excerpt from 1880 New South Wales colonial election § Tamworth

Notes

References

New South Wales state electoral results by district